An icon, from the Greek word for image, is a religious painting in the tradition of Christianity.

Icon may also refer to:

General concepts 
 Icon (semiotics), a sign characterised by iconicity, the resemblance to what it signifies
 Pictogram, a type of graphic sign
 Icon (computing), an image used in a graphical user interface
 Cultural icon, something or someone that is seen as representative of a given culture
 Pop icon, a celebrity, character, or object whose exposure in pop culture constitutes a defining characteristic of a given society or era
 Architectural icon, a groundbreaking or unique building
 Gay icon, an LGBT cultural icon
 Horror icon, a person or fictional character considered to be significant to one or more genres of horror

Art, entertainment and media

Books and magazines
 Icon (novel), a 1997 fiction novel by Frederick Forsyth
 Icon, a novel by Bodie and Brock Thoene
 iCon: Steve Jobs, a 2005 biography of Steve Jobs by Jeffrey Young
Icons: Creativity with Camera and Computer, an illustrated book by photographer Douglas Kirkland
 Icon (character), a Milestone/DC comic book superhero
Icon the Ungodly, a character from The world of Legend
 Icon (architecture magazine), British architecture and design magazine
 Icon (lifestyle magazine), a fashion and celebrity magazine
 ICON, a magazine published by SPH Media Trust
 I•CON, the International Journal of Constitutional Law, an academic legal journal

Film and television
 Icon (film), a 2005 thriller film
 Icons (TV series), an American documentary TV show
 "Icon" (Stargate SG-1), a 2004 television episode of Stargate SG-1

Games
 Def Jam: Icon, a 2007 fighting video game

Music 
 Icon (band), an American heavy metal/glam metal band (1981–1990)
 No Min-woo, stage name ICON, a South Korean actor and musician
 Icon (album series), a series of compilation albums released by Universal Music Enterprises
 Icon (Benighted album) (2007)
 Icon (Vince Gill album) (2010)
 Icon (Icon album) (1984)
 Icon (John Lennon album) (2014)
 Icon (Paradise Lost album) (1993)
 Icon (Wetton and Downes album) (2005)
 Icon (Trisha Yearwood album) (2010)
 DAAS Icon, a 1990 comedy album by Doug Anthony All Stars
 Icon 2 (2011), an album by George Strait
 Iconic (EP), by Icona Pop
 Icons (Eli Keszler album), 2021
 Icons (None More Black album) (2010)
 "Icon" (song), 2017 single by Jaden Smith
 The Singles 1992–2003, a greatest hits album by No Doubt, re-released as Icon

Brands and companies
 Hotel Icon (Houston), a hotel in Houston, Texas, US
 ICON Aircraft, an aircraft manufacturer in Vacaville, California, US
 Icon Books, a London-based publisher
 Icon Comics, a Marvel comics imprint
 Icon Group International, a publisher of automatically generated books compiled from Internet sources
 Icon Health Publications, an imprint of Icon Group International 
 Icon Productions, an American independent production company
 Icon Films, a British independent television production company
 ICON PLC, a multinational Contract Research Organization
 Nokia Lumia Icon, a smartphone made by Nokia 
 Geely Icon, a sport utility vehicle model
 ICON (blockchain platform), a decentralized, open-source blockchain with smart contract functionality

Organizations 
 Consorzio ICoN, a consortium of 21 Italian universities, focusing on philology
 Icon FC, an amateur association football club in New Jersey, United States
 Icon Theatre, a British theatre company
 Institute of Conservation, a British cultural heritage organisation
 International Council on Nanotechnology, a group concerned with risks and use of nanotechnology

Science and technology
 Icon (programming language), a high-level programming language
 ICON (microcomputer), a computer built in the 1980s
 ICOsahedral Nonhydrostatic, the global numerical weather prediction model of the German Weather Service
 Ionospheric Connection Explorer (ICON), a NASA satellite mission to study Earth's ionosphere

Science fiction conventions 
 Icon (Iowa science fiction convention)
 I-CON, an American science fiction fan convention
 ICon festival, an Israeli science fiction and fantasy fan convention
 List of ICON science fiction conventions

Other uses 
 Icon (roller coaster), a roller coaster at Blackpool Pleasure Beach, UK
 Icon Complex, a proposed, multi-purpose low-rise building in Hobart
 No Min-woo, stage name ICON, a South Korean actor and musician

See also 
 Icahn (disambiguation)
 Icône, a residential tower in Montreal, Canada
 Ikon (disambiguation)
 Iconography, the content of images, and the study of that subject